Udea pachygramma is a moth of the family Crambidae. It is endemic to the Hawaiian islands of Oahu and Hawaii.

External links

Moths described in 1899
Endemic moths of Hawaii
pachygramma